The Chottanikkara (correction of Jyotiannakkara)  Devi Temple is a temple dedicated to the Hindu mother goddess Bhagavati, a form of Mahalakshmi.She  is believed to be residing in Chottanikkara along with her husband Maha Vishnu. The temple is located at Chottanikkara, a southern suburb of the city of Kochi in Ernakulam district, in the state of Kerala, India and is one of the most popular temples in the state. The temple is also known for conducting exorcism.

In terms of temple architecture, the Chottanikkara temple stands out to be an ultimate testimonial to the ancient vishwakarma sthapathis (wooden sculpture) along with Sabarimala temple. Sree Mahamaya Bhagavati (Adi Parashakti), the goddess of Saraswathi, Lakshmi, and Parvati is one of the most popular deities in Kerala and the supreme mother goddess in Hinduism. Chottanikkara Devi (Melekavu Bhagavathi) is worshipped at the temple, in three different forms: as Mahasaraswati in the morning, draped in white; Mahalakshmi in noon, draped in crimson; and as Mahaparvati in the evening, decked in blue. Devotees used to chant "Amme Narayana, Devi Narayana, Lakshmi Narayana, Bhadre Narayana" in this temple. Goddess 'Keezhkkaavu bhagavathi' is believed to be Bhadrakali, in her fierce form or Ugra form. Bhadrakali, is a form of mother Kali, supposed to be born from the third eye of lord Shiva, to kill the demon king Darika. People suffering from mental illnesses and commonly visit the temple, as Chottanikkara Devi is said to cure her devotees. Guruthi pooja is a ritual done in the late evening to invoke the goddess Mahakali. Earlier 'Guruthi Pooja' was done only on Fridays. But nowadays, it is performed every day.

Legend

The area in which the temple is situated was once a dense jungle. A tribesman named Kannappan used to live in this forest. He was a devout worshipper of the goddess Mahakali, and would ritually sacrifice a buffalo to her every Friday (the day of the Goddess). One day, he found a calf near the forest. He kidnapped the calf and took her to his  stone altar. Just before he is about to sacrifice the calf, his daughter Pavizham stepped in and pleaded to him to stop the sacrifice. The man loved his daughter and thus let her keep the calf as a pet. Unfortunately, Pavizham died some days later, possibly due to a snake bite. Kannappan broke into tears and decided to cremate her body. To his surprise, his daughter's corpse disappeared. A nearby priest told him the reason for such an occurrence; Kannappan used to forcibly take young calves from their mothers and sacrificed them. As punishment, he met the same fate when his daughter died. When the tribesman looked for the calf, he found  the sacrifice alter shining  in its place. The priest explained that the  calf represented the divine couple, Lord Vishnu and Lakshmi. He asked Kannapan to pray before the alter everyday to undo his sins.

Since Kannappan's death, the stones were forgotten.  The stone was rediscovered accidentally by a low caste grass cutter, who found that blood was oozing out of a stone which she had accidentally cut. Horrified at what she saw, she brought the matter to the public's attention. A nearby priest was called to solve the problem. After devaprasnam, it was concluded that the stone was divine.
That day, the elder Brahmin of the Yedattu house came along with some puffed rice in a coconut shell and this was offered to the Goddess for the first time. Even today this system of offering puffed rice in a coconut shell continues. The Brahmins of Yedattu house became the hereditary priests at this temple since those days.

Another legend associated to the temple is that of the spiritual leader Shankaracharya. During the time where he lived, Adi Shankara realised that there wasn't a single temple in Kerala that signified the worship of goddess Saraswati. As a result, he himself went to the kashmir and meditated for many days for the goddess to appear before him. His meditation bore fruit and before him stood the stunningly beautiful goddess, clad in red. On enquiry, he said that he would like to bring the goddess to Kerala and establish a temple dedicated to her worship. This way the people from Kerala would not have to go such far off distances to worship her, as in the case for those who were old and aged. After a lot of persuasion, the goddess agreed; she would follow him by foot wherever he went, but only on one condition. If he trusts her, then he was not allowed to look back to see if she followed him or not. If he did, then wouldn't go any further. He agrees and they proceed walking. They were walking down the Kodachadri hills, with Shankara leading the way and goddess' anklets tinkling and letting him know that she was with him. After walking some distance, the tinkling stopped all of a sudden. Shankara waited a few moments and stole a quick look backwards to find the goddess still with him, watching him with reproach. In keeping with the condition, the goddess stopped right there. This is the spot which would turn out to be the Mookambika temple. Shankara, however, was not one to give up. He apologized profusely for breaking the condition and repeatedly begged and pleaded with the goddess to go with him to Kerala. After many pleas, the goddess agrees to a compromise and came to Chottanikara in Kerala, where the Chottanikara temple stood. 

From early hours of morning, goddess would come and appear before the devotees at the Chottanikkara temple. Then in the afternoon, she would return to the Mookambika temple (spot where she stopped). Since then, the sanctum doors of the Chottanikkara temple were opened during early morning hours in honour of worshipping goddess Saraswati before the doors of the main sanctum in Mookambika temple were opened.

Legend behind Keezhkavu
The idol at Keezhkavu didn't come until after the temple was built. One night, a Brahmin 
by name Gupthan Namboodiri who was pursued by a disguised Yakshi  (an evil spirit), while on a visit to meet his friend Kosapilli Namboodiri who practiced occult sciences. It seems, the Yakshi took the form of a pretty maiden and tried to entice Gupthan. Since he was carrying a palm leaf copy of Devi Mahatmyam , she was not able to do him any harm. However, Gupthan was attracted to her. Later when he reached his friend Kosapilli Namboodiri's house, Gupthan narrated the incident and Kosapill deduced that the lady was a Yakshi. He then gave Gupthan Namboodiri an enchanted towel and rice to carry along on his return journey to protect himself from the Yakshi. When Gupthan saw the Yakshi following him he ran towards the Chottanikkara temple ,one the way he threw the rice and swirled the towel at the Yakshi which slowed the her and on reaching, jumped into the compound of the temple sanctum. The Yakshi who was pursuing him could only catch hold of his feet. When Gupthan cried out for help the mother Goddess Bhagavathy, she came out as Maha Kali and slayed the Yakshi and threw her corpse on to the temple tree base and then wash of the blood in the temple tank. That tank is known today as Yakshikoulam or Rakthakoulam , where the Kali idol was found hundreds of years later by Vilwamangalam of Guruvayoor.

Makam Thozhal

The annual Chottanikkara Makam Thozhal is the major festival in Chottanikara temple. It is believed that it was on this day (mithuna lagna on Makam) that the Vilvumangala Swamiyar saw the goddess at the temple and the devotees worship the goddess at this time.

On the Makam Thozhal day, the ritualistic bath of goddess in the morning at the sacred pond Calli Onakkuttichira far on the northern side of the temple. After that, the goddess is brought to the temple accompanied by Lord Sastha on the back of seven caparisoned elephants march towards the "Pooraparambu" the traditional vantage point where they remain till 11 a.m.

At the mid-day the door of Sanctum Sanctorum closes for Ucha pooja. And re-opens at 2 p.m for the "Makam Darsanam", the time at which Vilvumangala Swamiyar saw the goddess at the temple. At that time Devi who appears in her sacred full-fledged splendour and glory decked in her sacred gold ornaments, precious jewellery and innumerable garlands. This is exactly the form of vision which Villwamangalam Swamiyar was believed to have had when he faced westward after the "Prathishta" (installation) of Kizhukkavu Bhagavathy (Bhadrakali), Chottanikkara Devi appears at this moment clad in glittering clothes brilliant ornaments and fine jewellery with her four arms bearing varam, Abhayam, Shank and Chakram (Offering gift and refuge) to her ardent devotees. It is fervently believed that Darsanam at this moment will result in the fulfillment of all prayers and cherished desires. It is fervently believed that those who gain Darsanam at this crucial Mithuna Lagna, will be blessed with the fulfillment of their long standing desire and prayers.

Worship practices

The presiding deity is known by various names like Rajarajeswari, Mahalakshmi, Durga, Bhagavati, Aadi Parashakthi and Amman. Bhagavati is worshipped as Mahasaraswati or Kollur Mookambika in the morning, Bhadrakali in the noon and Durga in the evening. There are sub-shrines for Lord Shiva, Lord Ganapathi, Lord Dharmasastha, Snake deities, Brahmarakshassu and Yakshi in this temple.

The temple is known for curing mental illness and disorders due to evil spirits. The patients are brought to the priest(melsanthi), who engages with them in some conversation. He nails a part of the hair of the patient in the temple tree, indicating that evil spirit is captured in the tree and the patients are cured off their illness. Neem leaves, lime and chillies are taken home from the temple, which are believed to ward off evil spirits.

Important months 

 Chingam - Thiruvonam is celebrated in the temple with Thiruvonam feast (annadanam) to all Pilgrims.
 Kanni - Navarathri aghosham is a famous festival, which attracts large number of devotees. On Vijayadasami day of the Navarathri utsavam, Vidyarambham is conducted.
 Vrishchikam - The Vrishchicka Mandala mahotsavam (festival) is celebrated during the entire period of mandalam season. Daily annadanam, stage programmes, Naama japam etc. are conducted. During this month, Thrikkarthika festival comes. It is the birthday of the Goddess and the festival runs for three days, Kaarthika, Rohini and Makayiram. On these days, there is ezhunnellippu, Kazhcha siveli, stage programme, deepaalankaaram, Kaarthika vilakku, fireworks etc. There is also lakshaarchana and Vedamura abishekam for 15 days starting from 1 January. On the makaravilakku day there is lakshadeepam (lighting of one lakh lamps) and fire works.
 Kumbam - The annual festival of the temple comes in Kumbham. It begins with Kodiyettu (Flag hoisting ceremony) on Rohini day, lasts for 9 days and ends on Uthram star. There is Pooram ezhunnellippu with 7 Elephants in the morning and at night. The ulsavam ends with Uthram Aarattu and Valiya Guruthi (Atham Guruthy).
 Medam - On the Vishu day, there will be Vishukani, Vishusadya and ezhunellippu on 3 elephants.
 Karkitakam - Ramayana masam (Ramayana Month) is celebrated during this period. Daily puranam reading (Ramayanam, Bhagavatham, etc.,) daily annadhanam devotional speeches and discourse etc., is conducted - there is also illam Nira, when fresh paddy of the year is offered to God.
 Tuesday and Friday are important dates for Bhagavathy temples. You can see heavy rush on these days.

See also 
 Sree Poornathrayeesa Temple
 Mookambika temple
 Temples of Kerala

References

External links 

 Official temple page
 Thiruvankulam tourism page

Tourist attractions in Kochi
Bhagavathi temples in Kerala
Hindu temples in Ernakulam district
Devi temples in Kerala